Leyla ile Mecnun (Leyla and Mecnun) is a Turkish television comedy series. The series, set in Istanbul and directed by Onur Ünlü, premiered in 2011 on TRT. It is a surreal, absurdist comedy revolving around the parody of the poetic love story of Layla and Majnun. It returned with a new season on the streaming platform Exxen in 2021.

Plot 
Leyla and Mecnun were born in the same hospital and shared the same crib because of a shortage—hence the series' catchphrase, "They found each other from the beginning". They were named after the legendary lovers Leyla and Mecnun. Mecnun, a confused 25-year-old from a middle-class family, lives in an historic Istanbul neighborhood. Mecnun falls in love with Leyla at first sight, and becomes obsessed with her. Leyla, from an upper-class family, leads a different life than others in the neighborhood. She enjoys the time she spends with Mecnun, since life is more interesting with him.

Other notable characters in the series are Dede, Iskender, Ismail, Erdal, Yavuz, and Arda. Dede, a character in Turkish folktales, appears in dreams to provide direction and foreknowledge. A surrealistic element of the show, Dede appears in one of Mecnun's dreams; when Mecnun wakes up, he sees Dede standing by his bed. Afterwards, he lives with Mecnun to help him with Leyla.

Iskender, Mecnun's father, drives an unreliable taxi and is devoted to his family. To make his son happy, he asks Leyla's father for permission for Leyla and Mecnun to marry despite repeated refusals.

Ismail, Mecnun's closest friend, is a colorful character who is loyal and pure at heart. It is learned in one episode that Ismail and his father were abandoned by his mother because her life was not colorful enough. Ismail takes this literally, and dresses accordingly. He was adopted by another family when his father became terminally ill. His father told Ismail that he was leaving to work as a seaman and would return someday, waving from the ship; since then, Ismail has been waving to passing ships every day from the shore. Nothing is known about Ismail's personal life or where he lives. He frequently changes jobs, failing at (or disliking) each one. Ismail is interested in genealogy, and notable people from the past (such as Beethoven, Picasso and Dostoyevsky) appear in his flashbacks as his distant relatives during most episodes.

Erdal is the neighborhood grocer, whose work defines his life. Sometimes greedy and inconsiderate, he neglects his friends and is tactless and pessimistic. With supermarkets springing up everywhere, Erdal personifies an endangered element of traditional Turkish society. His grocery store is a gathering place for the characters.

Yavuz, a friendly neighborhood thief, describes himself as a "performance artist". His justifications for stealing vary by episode and include helping his blind girlfriend, helping his friends and unrequited love. Yavuz' talents are used to benefit the neighborhood; he resents being called a thief, and always retorts: "Am I such a person?" He enjoys reading poetry.

Arda, Leyla's classmate, is also in love with her and his wealthy father tries to persuade her to marry his son. Arda, his father and their servants are the show's main antagonists.

Characters
 Mecnun Çınar (Ali Atay): Son of middle-class Pakize and Iskender and an underachieving distance education student
 Leyla Yılmaz (Ezgi Asaroğlu): Mecnun's first Leyla, who dies in a car crash and whose organs are donated by her parents
 İsmail Abi (big-brother Ismail) (Serkan Keskin): Mecnun's childhood friend, a job-hopper waiting for his father to return. He's known for his ether addiction.
 İskender (Ahmet Mümtaz Taylan): Mecnun's father, a taciturn taxi driver
 Ak Sakallı Dede (white-bearded grandpa) (Köksal Engür): Elderly man who first appears in Mecnun's dreams, later living with Mecnun and his father
 Erdal Bakkal (Cengiz Bozkurt): Miserly neighborhood grocery-store owner. Iskender's childhood friend, he is selfish and shameless.
 Yavuz (Osman Sonant): Thief who claims to be a performance artist. A master lock-picker who appreciates the lighter weight of LED televisions, he is a close friend of Mecnun.
 Arda (Ushan Çakır): Leyla's spoiled ex-boyfriend, who likes to show off with his father's money
 Sedef Leyla (Zeynep Çamcı): Pizza-delivery woman who is involved in Leyla and Şirin's car accident. Critically injured, she receives Leyla's liver. When Mecnun learns that her middle name is Leyla, he develops a crush on her.
 Şirin (Müge Boz): A clever physics student who is injured in Leyla and Sedef's car accident and receives Leyla's heart. Mecnun loves her, partly because she has his lover's heart, and she changes her name to Leyla for him.
 Ömer Yedinci (Atilla Şendil): Father of Leyla (Melis Birkan) and İskender's childhood friend, who appears in the third season, he owns a tire shop.
 Leyla Yedinci (Melis Birkan): Ömer's daughter, with whom Mecnun falls in love at first sight
 Pakize Çınar (Asuman Dabak): Mecnun's mother
 Metin Yılmaz (İştar Gökseven): Leyla's father
 Sevim Yılmaz: Leyla's mother
 Zeynep (Beste Bereket)
 Kamil (Mehmet Usta)
 Karabasan (Nightmare) (Köksal Engür): Arda's father
 Benjamin (Sarp Aydınoğlu)
 Nurten: Erdal's wife
 Leyla the Goth (Neslihan Aker): Nurten's niece
 Çakmasakallı dede (fake bearded grandpa)
 Hidayet (Cihan Ercan)
 Fyodor Dostoyevsky (Bülent Baytar)
 Zekiye (Esra Kızıldoğan)
 Telat Abi (Sadi Celil Cengiz)
 Kubilay (Kubilay Çamlıdağ)

Significant Leylas
"Leyla, Leyla, Leyla ... Everyone is Leyla, Yavuz! Literally! I guess only my mom is not named Leyla ... Actually, let me go ask her ..." says Mecnun in one episode. These are the series' significant Leylas, in chronological order:
 Leyla Yılmaz (Ezgi Asaroğlu): The first Leyla dies in a car crash. Mecnun becomes depressed after her death, not speaking for a whole year, and tries to jump off a cliff when the doctor tells him Leyla is dead. Ismail Abi talks to him, and they sit down and cry.
 Şirin (Müge Boz): Changes her name to Leyla to impress Mecnun, whom she first thinks is strange before she warms up to him. Unaware that Leyla is an organ donor, he sees no purpose in life without her. When a man who received one of Leyla's corneas visits Mecnun's house, Mecnun asks: "Leyla?" The man says that when he closes his eyes he sees Mecnun, and though that if he found Mecnun he could be at peace. When Mecnun learns that Leyla's parents donated her organs, he tries to find every recipient to see who received her heart. Although he suspects Şirin, he is unable to ask her. After a romantic dinner one night, Mecnun brings her back to her house and gingerly tries to broach the subject. Şirin sees Mecnun's embarrassment and says, "Actually ... I know what you are looking for. And I have the answer". She tells him to come closer, and shows him her surgical scar. Mecnun puts his ear to her heart and hears, "Mecnun ... Mecnun ...". Weeping, he asks: "Leyla? ... Leyla? ... Leyla ..."
 Sedef Leyla (Zeynep Çamcı): Sedef is a tough pizza delivery woman. Although her middle name is Leyla, only her father uses it and she wants no one else to call her Leyla. Sedef lives with her devoted grandmother; her father abandoned the family when she was young, and her mother died shortly afterwards. One day, she bumps into Mecnun and drops a key. Unaware of the key, she argues briefly with him and leaves. Mecnun then finds the key and takes it to return to her. He forgets to return the key, which makes Sedef suspect that he is a thief. When Mecnun begins looking for Leyla's heart, he visits Sedef's house because she is on the list of organ recipients. Although Sedef is not home, her grandmother becomes the grandmother he never had and he returns to her house every morning. Eventually, Sedef begins to like him. One day, Mecnun and Sedef get into an argument and she throws him out. Sedef's grandmother, trying to reconcile them, accidentally calls Sedef "Leyla".
 Leyla (Melis Birkan): The last major Leyla in the series, who appears in season three, most closely resembles the original Leyla. Like the first Leyla, Mecnun falls in love with her when he sees her at the top of the stairs. Leyla is a businesswoman, and Mecnun's constant presence sabotages her company; once, he starts a fire. When Leyla criticizes him one day, Meclun says: "What are you doing? Why are you always criticizing me? Why are you always doing this? For once, turn around and look at yourself. Maybe you are to blame, huh? Maybe you are just not good enough. Maybe you are not made for this job. If you can't do this job, then don't. Stop!" Leyla tries to slap him, Mecnun gently grabs her hand and they gaze into each other's eyes.

Group "Leyla The Band"
Also, Soundtrack of "Leyla ile Mecnun". It's composed of "Leyla ile Mecnun" actors: Ali Atay, Onur Ünlü, Serkan Keskin, Osman Sonant, Fırat İkisivri, Sarp Aydınoğlu, Sarper Aksoy. Group's tour "Leyla ile Mecnun'a Veda & Ben de Özledim'e Merhaba" in 2013.

Book of Series
Screenwriter of series, Burak Aksak, published "Leyla ile Mecnun" in April 2018. He stated that this book has different final.

Spin Off "Ben de Özledim" 
Leyla ile Mecnun was expected to be renewed for a new season. However it was cancelled after casts' support to the Taksim Gezi protest. The same actors filmed the TV series "Ben de Özledim" about actors who have their TV series cancelled. The first episode of Ben de Özledim tells the finale of Leyla ile Mecnun, but Ben de Özledim is cancelled after 13 episodes.

Unbroadcast finale

In the unbroadcast finale of the show, it was to be revealed that Mecnun actually had an accident when he was a child, leaving him permanently bedridden. He could not talk or move. His mother left, and his father cared for him. In reality, the entire TV series had taken place in Mecnun's imagination.

There is more of a meaning to the characters and only some of them were translatable.

While Mecnun is sleeping, a tree leaf would wave through the window; this tree leaf  is supposed to represent Yavuz. Mecnun can only see the tree's leaves shadow waving through the window; this is a reason as to why Yavuz in the show almost always goes into houses through the windows. Yavuz, the tree, was planted right in their back garden by Iskender and also gave its name.

Dede is a syringe that a doctor regularly injects to Mecnun. It is a medicine fighting diseases inside Mecnun. In the show, he fights negative thoughts by trying to get rid of them via talking.

Ismail is abgold fish Mecnun watches. Ismail is regularly  in his bowl.

Leyla is Mecnun’s first grade crush. However, he has never seen Leyla nor talked to her as he has only heard her name. The reason why Leyla changes through the series is because Mecnun, while watching TV, sees different women so he assumes that that one of those women which he likes is named Leyla.

The living room seen in the show is where he usually is at so most of his life he is in this room.

Broadcast schedule

Awards

References 

2011 Turkish television series debuts
Turkish comedy television series
Turkish Radio and Television Corporation original programming
Television shows set in Istanbul
Television series produced in Istanbul
Television series set in the 2010s